Admiral (Ret.) Agus Suhartono (pronounced ; born 25 August 1955) is the former Commander of the Indonesian National Armed Forces.

Biography
Agus Suhartono was born in Blitar, East Java on 25 August 1955 to state employee Mangundipura and Masiyem. He attended elementary school at SDN Sukorejo 2 Blitar, junior high school at SMP Negeri 1 Blitar, and senior high school at SMA Negeri 1 Blitar. After graduating in 1974, he followed his older brother's footsteps enrolled in the Naval Academy, which he graduated in 1978.

He was appointed chief of staff of the Indonesian Navy on November 9, 2009. He was later promoted to commander of the Indonesian National Armed Forces on September 28, 2010, replacing Djoko Santoso. His appointment was well received by the People's Representative Council. Tjahjo Kumolo, the chairman for the opposition, said that Agus "deserves the post more than (the) other (chiefs of staff).”

As commander, Agus has worked to increase the professionalism in the military and military reform. He also hopes to modernize Indonesia's aging military equipment.

Agus has also vowed to close the military-owned businesses, which have been seen as causing human rights violations by human rights groups and military analysts, and plans to further cooperation between the military and the Indonesian National Police in fighting terrorism.

In 2010, Agus received the Meritorious Service Medal (Military) for fostering good relations between the Indonesian and Singaporean military.

Personal life
Agus is the first of ten siblings. He has a wife, Tetty Sugiarti, and two children.

References

|-

|-

Living people
1955 births
People from Blitar
Indonesian admirals
Chiefs of Staff of the Indonesian Navy
Commanders of the Indonesian National Armed Forces